The Zelennikovskaya narrow-gauge railway is located in Arkhangelsk Oblast, Russia.

Current status 
The Zelennikovskaya forestry railway's first narrow-gauge line emerged in 1949, in the area of Verkhnetoyemsky District, Arkhangelsk Oblast from the village Zelennik. The railway operates scheduled freight services from Zelennik, used for forestry tasks for transportation of felled logs and forestry workers and operates year-round.

Rolling stock

Locomotives 
 TU6A – No. 0726 (snowplow), 3459, 2061, 3080
 TU8 – No. 0333, 0191
 TU4 – No. 2663
 TD-5U "Pioneer"

Railroad cars 
 Boxcar
 Tank car
 Snowplow
 Dining car
 Crane LT-110
 Passenger car
 Railway log-car and flatcar
 Hopper car to transport track ballast

Gallery

See also
Narrow-gauge railways in Russia
List of Russian narrow-gauge railways rolling stock

References

External links

 Верхне-Тоемская УЖД (Зеленник) 
 Zelennikovskaya forestry railway (interactive map)

750 mm gauge railways in Russia
Railway lines opened in 1949
Rail transport in Arkhangelsk Oblast
Logging railways in Russia